Chapter and verse divisions did not appear in the original texts of Judeo-Christian bibles; such divisions form part of the paratext of the Bible. Since the early 13th century, most copies and editions of the Bible have presented all but the shortest of the scriptural books with divisions into chapters, generally a page or so in length. Since the mid-16th century, editors have further subdivided each chapter into verses – each consisting of a few short lines or of one or more sentences. Esther 8:9 is the longest verse in the Bible. Sometimes a sentence spans more than one verse, as in the case of Ephesians 2:8–9, and sometimes there is more than one sentence in a single verse, as in the case of Genesis 1:2.

The Jewish divisions of the Hebrew text differ at various points from those used by Christians. For instance, Jewish tradition regards the ascriptions to many Psalms as independent verses or as parts of the subsequent verses, whereas established Christian practice treats each Psalm ascription as independent and unnumbered, resulting in 116 more verses in Jewish versions than in the Christian texts. Some chapter divisions also occur in different places, e.g. Hebrew Bibles have 1 Chronicles 5:27–41 where Christian translations have 1 Chronicles 6:1–15.

History

Chapters
Early manuscripts of the biblical texts did not contain the chapter and verse divisions in the numbered form familiar to modern readers.  In antiquity Hebrew texts were divided into paragraphs (parashot) that were identified by two letters of the Hebrew alphabet. Peh (פ‎) indicated an "open" paragraph that began on a new line, while Samekh (ס‎) indicated a "closed" paragraph that began on the same line after a small space. These two letters begin the Hebrew words open (patuach) and closed (sagur), and are, themselves, open in shape (פ) and closed (ס). The earliest known copies of the Book of Isaiah from the Dead Sea Scrolls used parashot divisions, although they differ slightly from the Masoretic divisions.

The Hebrew Bible was also divided into some larger sections.  In Israel, the Torah (its first five books) were divided into 154 sections so that they could be read through aloud in weekly worship over the course of three years. In Babylonia, it was divided into 53 or 54 sections (Parashat ha-Shavua) so it could be read through in one year.  The New Testament was divided into topical sections known as kephalaia by the fourth century. Eusebius of Caesarea divided the gospels into parts that he listed in tables or canons. Neither of these systems correspond with modern chapter divisions.  (See fuller discussions below.)

Chapter divisions, with titles, are also found in the 9th-century Tours manuscript Paris Bibliothèque Nationale MS Lat. 3, the so-called Bible of Rorigo.

Archbishop Stephen Langton and Cardinal Hugo de Sancto Caro developed different schemas for systematic division of the Bible in the early 13th century. It is the system of Archbishop Langton on which the modern chapter divisions are based.

While chapter divisions have become nearly universal, editions of the Bible have sometimes been published without them.  Such editions, which typically use thematic or literary criteria to divide the biblical books instead, include John Locke's Paraphrase and Notes on the Epistles of St. Paul (1707), Alexander Campbell's The Sacred Writings (1826), Daniel Berkeley Updike's fourteen-volume The Holy Bible Containing the Old and New Testaments and the Apocrypha, Richard Moulton's The Modern Reader's Bible (1907), Ernest Sutherland Bates's The Bible Designed to Be Read as Living Literature (1936), The Books of the Bible (2007) from the International Bible Society (Biblica), Adam Lewis Greene's five-volume Bibliotheca (2014), and the six-volume ESV Reader's Bible (2016) from Crossway Books.

Verses

Since at least 916 the Tanakh has contained an extensive system of multiple levels of section, paragraph, and phrasal divisions that were indicated in Masoretic vocalization and cantillation markings. One of the most frequent of these was a special type of punctuation, the sof passuq, symbol for a period or sentence break, resembling the colon of English and Latin orthography. With the advent of the printing press and the translation of the Hebrew Bible into English, versifications were made that correspond predominantly with the existing Hebrew sentence breaks, with a few isolated exceptions. Most attribute these to Rabbi Isaac Nathan ben Kalonymus's work for the first Hebrew Bible concordance around 1440.

The first person to divide New Testament chapters into verses was the Italian Dominican biblical scholar Santes Pagnino (1470–1541), but his system was never widely adopted. His verse divisions in the New Testament were far longer than those known today. The Parisian printer Robert Estienne created another numbering in his 1551 edition of the Greek New Testament, which was also used in his 1553 publication of the Bible in French. Estienne's system of division was widely adopted, and it is this system which is found in almost all modern Bibles. Estienne produced a 1555 Vulgate that is the first Bible to include the verse numbers integrated into the text. Before this work, they were printed in the margins.

The first English New Testament to use the verse divisions was a 1557 translation by William Whittingham (c. 1524–1579). The first Bible in English to use both chapters and verses was the Geneva Bible published shortly afterwards in 1560. These verse divisions soon gained acceptance as a standard way to notate verses, and have since been used in nearly all English Bibles and the vast majority of those in other languages.

Jewish tradition

The Masoretic Text of the Hebrew Bible notes several different kinds of subdivisions within the biblical books:

Passukim
Most important are the verses, or passukim (MH spelling; now pronounced pesukim by all speakers). According to Talmudic tradition, the division of the text into verses is of ancient origin. In Masoretic versions of the Bible, the end of a verse, or sof passuk, is indicated by a small mark in its final word called a silluq (which means "stop"). Less formally, verse endings are usually also indicated by two horizontal dots following the word with a silluq.

Parashot
The Masoretic Text also contains sections, or portions, called parashot or parashiyot. The end of a parashah is usually indicated by a space within a line (a "closed" section) or a new line beginning (an "open" section). The division of the text reflected in the parashot is usually thematic. Unlike chapters, the parashot are not numbered, but some of them have special titles.

In early manuscripts (most importantly in Tiberian Masoretic manuscripts, such as the Aleppo codex), an "open" section may also be represented by a blank line, and a "closed" section by a new line that is slightly indented (the preceding line may also not be full). These latter conventions are no longer used in Torah scrolls and printed Hebrew Bibles. In this system, the one rule differentiating "open" and "closed" sections is that "open" sections must always start at the beginning of a new line, while "closed" sections never start at the beginning of a new line.

Sedarim
Another division of the biblical books found in the Masoretic Text is the division into sedarim. This division is not thematic, but is almost entirely based upon the quantity of text. For the Torah, this division reflects the triennial cycle of reading that was practiced by the Jews of the Land of Israel.

Christian versions
The Byzantines also introduced a concept roughly similar to chapter divisions, called kephalaia (singular kephalaion, literally meaning heading). This system, which was in place no later than the 5th century, is not identical to the present chapters. Unlike the modern chapters, which tend to be of roughly similar length, the distance from one kephalaion mark to the next varied greatly in length both within a book and from one book to the next.  For example, the Sermon on the Mount, comprising three chapters in the modern system, has but one kephalaion mark, while the single modern chapter 8 of the Gospel of Matthew has several, one per miracle.  Moreover, there were far fewer kephalaia in the Gospel of John than in the Gospel of Mark, even though the latter is the shorter text. In the manuscripts, the kephalaia with their numbers, their standard titles (titloi) and their page numbers would be listed at the beginning of each biblical book; in the book's main body, they would be marked only with arrow-shaped or asterisk-like symbols in the margin, not in the text itself.

The titles usually referred to the first event or the first theological point of the section only, and some kephalaia are manifestly incomplete if one stops reading at the point where the next kephalaion begins (for example, the combined accounts of the miracles of the Daughter of Jairus and of the healing of the woman with a haemorrhage  gets two marked kephalaia, one titled of the daughter of the synagogue ruler at the beginning when the ruler approaches Jesus and one titled of the woman with the flow of blood where the woman enters the picture – well before the ruler's daughter is healed and the storyline of the previous kephalaion is thus properly concluded). Thus the kephalaia marks are rather more like a system of bookmarks or links into a continuous text, helping a reader to quickly find one of several well-known episodes, than like a true system of chapter divisions.

Cardinal Hugo de Sancto Caro is often given credit for first dividing the Latin Vulgate into chapters in the real sense, but it is the arrangement of his contemporary and fellow cardinal Stephen Langton who in 1205 created the chapter divisions which are used today. They were then inserted into Greek manuscripts of the New Testament in the 16th century. Robert Estienne (Robert Stephanus) was the first to number the verses within each chapter, his verse numbers entering printed editions in 1551 (New Testament) and 1571 (Hebrew Bible).

The division of the Bible into chapters and verses has received criticism from some traditionalists and modern scholars. Critics state that the text is often divided in an incoherent way, or at inappropriate rhetorical points, and that it encourages citing passages out of context. Nevertheless, the chapter and verse numbers have become indispensable as technical references for Bible study.

Several modern publications of the Bible have eliminated numbering of chapters and verses. Biblica published such a version of the NIV in 2007 and 2011. In 2014, Crossway published the ESV Reader's Bible and Bibliotheca published a modified ASV. Projects such as Icthus also exist which strip chapter and verse numbers from existing translations.

Bible statistics
The number of words can vary depending upon aspects such as whether the Hebrew alphabet in Psalm 119, the superscriptions listed in some of the Psalms, and the subscripts traditionally found at the end of the Pauline epistles, are included.
Except where stated, the following apply to the King James Version of the Bible in its modern 66-book Protestant form including the New Testament and the protocanonical Old Testament, not the deuterocanonical books.

Chapters
 There are 929 chapters in the Old Testament.
 187 chapters in the Pentateuch
 249 chapters in the Historical books
 243 chapters in the Poetic books ("Wisdom")
 183 chapters in the Major prophets
 67 chapters in the Minor prophets
 There are 260 chapters in the New Testament. 
 89 chapters in the Gospels
 28 chapters in Acts
 87 chapters in the Pauline Epistles (excluding Hebrews)
 34 chapters in the General Epistles (including Hebrews)
 22 chapters in Revelation
 This gives a total of 1,189 chapters (on average, 18 per book).
 Psalm 117, the shortest chapter, is also the middle chapter of the Bible, being the 595th Chapter.
 Psalm 119 is the longest chapter of the Bible.
 Five books are a single chapter: Obadiah, Philemon, 2 & 3 John, Jude. In many printed editions, the chapter number is omitted for these books, and references just use the verse numbers.

Verses
 There are 23,145 verses in the Old Testament and 7,957 verses in the New Testament. This gives a total of 31,102 verses, which is an average of a little more than 26 verses per chapter.
 Psalm 103:1–2 being the 15,551st and 15,552nd verses is in the middle of the 31,102 verses of the Bible.
 John 11:35 ("Jesus wept") is the shortest verse in most English translations. Some translations — including the New International Version, New Living Translation, New Life Version, Holman Christian Standard Bible and New International Reader's Version — render Job 3:2 as "He said". However, that is a translators' condensation of the Hebrew which literally translated is: "And Job answered and said."

 The shortest verse in the Greek New Testament is Luke 20:30 ("και ο δευτερος", "And the second") with twelve letters, according to the Westcott and Hort text. In the Textus Receptus, the shortest verse is 1 Thessalonians 5:16 ("παντοτε χαιρετε", "Rejoice always") with fourteen letters, since Stephanus' rendering of Luke 20:30 includes some additional words.
 1 Chronicles 1:24 ("Σαλα", "Shelah") is the shortest verse in the Septuagint.
 1 Kings 12:24 is the longest verse in the Septuagint (1,017 words). 
 Isaiah 10:8 ("", "For he shall say") is the shortest verse in the Latin Vulgate.
 Esther 8:9 is the longest verse in the Masoretic Text. The discovery of several manuscripts at Qumran (in the Dead Sea Scrolls) has reopened what is considered the most original text of 1 Samuel 11; if one believes that those manuscripts better preserve the text, several verses in 1 Samuel 11 surpass Esther 8:9 in length.
 Exodus 20:13,14,15 and Deuteronomy 5:17 are the shortest verses in the Masoretic Text.
 John 11:25 is the most read verse in funerals.

See also

 Bible
 Bible citation
 List of omitted Bible (New Testament) verses
 Parashah

References

External links
 How Many Words In Each Book of the Bible Sortable table of data about chapters, verses, words, and other info on each Bible book
 STEP Documentation
 OSIS Documentation 

13th-century introductions
 
 
Referencing systems